Pietro Carlo was a Roman Catholic prelate who served as Bishop of Caorle (1470–1513).

Biography
On 12 July 1470, Pietro Carlo was appointed during the papacy of Pope Paul II as Bishop of Caorle.
He served as Bishop of Caorle until his resignation in 1513.

See also
Catholic Church in Italy

References

External links and additional sources
 (for Chronology of Bishops)
 (for Chronology of Bishops)

15th-century Italian Roman Catholic bishops
16th-century Italian Roman Catholic bishops
Bishops appointed by Pope Paul II